Chris Jackson (born 29 October 1973) is a Scottish footballer, who played for Hibernian, Stirling Albion, Cowdenbeath, Clydebank, Montrose, East Fife, Stenhousemuir, Brechin City and Arbroath.

References

External links

1973 births
Living people
Footballers from Edinburgh
Scottish footballers
Association football midfielders
Scottish Football League players
Hibernian F.C. players
Stirling Albion F.C. players
Cowdenbeath F.C. players
Clydebank F.C. (1965) players
Montrose F.C. players
East Fife F.C. players
Stenhousemuir F.C. players
Brechin City F.C. players
Arbroath F.C. players